Edda is a feminine given name which may refer to:

 Edda Adler (born 1937), Argentine chemist and biologist
 Edda Heiðrún Backman (1957–2016), Icelandic actress, voice actress, singer, painter and director
 Edda Björgvinsdóttir (born 1952), Icelandic actress, comedian, writer and director
 Edda Bresciani (born 1930), Italian Egyptologist
 Edda Buding (1936–2014), German tennis player
 Edy Campagnoli (1934–1995), Italian television personality and actress Edda Campagnoli
 Edda Ceccoli (born 1947), Captain Regent of San Marino from 1991 to 1992
 Edda Dell'Orso (born 1935), Italian singer
 Edda Ferronao (born 1934), Italian former actress
 Edda Garðarsdóttir (born 1979), Icelandic football coach and former player
 Edda Göring (1938–2018), German politician, only child of Hermann Göring
 Edda Magnason (born 1984), Swedish singer-songwriter, musician and film actress of Icelandic descent
 Edda Moser (born 1938), German soprano
 Edda Mussolini (1910–1995), eldest child of Benito Mussolini
 Edda Renouf (born 1943), American painter and printmaker
 Edda Seippel (1919–1993), German actress
 Edda Soligo (1905–1984), Italian actress

Feminine given names